Salvatore Parlato (born 28 August 1986) is an Italian basketball player for Sidigas Avellino of the Lega Basket Serie A (LBA). Standing at 1.96 m (6 ft 5 in), he usually plays as guard.

Professional career
On 7 December 2016, at age 30, Parlato scored 5 points in a Basketball Champions League game versus Mega Leks, which were his first points in a European competition.

References

1986 births
Living people
S.S. Felice Scandone players
Italian men's basketball players
Lega Basket Serie A players
Shooting guards
People from Avellino
Sportspeople from the Province of Avellino